LN3 or LN-3 may refer to:
 LN-3 inertial navigation system
 Buick LN3 engine
 Svenska Flygfabriken LN-3 Seagull